Pitar hebraeus is a species of bivalves belonging to the family Veneridae.

The species is found in Africa, Malesia and Northern America.

References

Bibliography 
 Dautzenberg, Ph. (1923). Liste préliminaire des mollusques marins de Madagascar et description de deux espèces nouvelles. J. conchyliol. 68: 21-744
 Dautzenberg P. (1929). Contribution à l'étude de la faune de Madagascar: Mollusca marina testacea. Faune des colonies françaises, 3(4): 321-636, pls 4-7. Société d'Editions géographiques, maritimes et coloniales, Paris.
 Huber, M. (2010). Compendium of bivalves. A full-color guide to 3,300 of the world's marine bivalves. A status on Bivalvia after 250 years of research. Hackenheim: ConchBooks. 901 pp., 1 CD-ROM

External links
 Lamarck, J.B. (1818). (volume 5 of) Histoire naturelle des Animaux sans Vertèbres, préséntant les caractères généraux et particuliers de ces animaux, leur distribution, leurs classes, leurs familles, leurs genres, et la citation des principales espèces qui s'y rapportent; precedes d'une Introduction offrant la determination des caracteres essentiels de l'Animal, sa distinction du vegetal et desautres corps naturels, enfin, l'Exposition des Principes fondamentaux de la Zoologie. Paris, Deterville. vol 5: 612 p
 Krauss, F. (1848) Die Südafrikanischen Mollusken. Ein Beitrag zur Kenntniss der Mollusken des Kap- und Natallandes und zur Geographischen Verbreitung derselben mit Beschreibung und Abbildung der neuen Arten. Ebner and Seubert, Stuttgart, 140 pp., 6 pls.
 Deshayes, G. P. (1853-1855). Catalogue of the Conchifera or bivalve shells in the collection of the British Museum. British Museum, London, Part I. Cyprinidae, Veneridae and Glauconomidae, pp. ii + 216 pp. [introduction by J. E. Gray [27 June 1853]; Part II, Petricoladae (concluded), Corbiculadae, pp. 217-292]
 Spry, J.F. (1964). The sea shells of Dar es Salaam: Part 2: Pelecypoda (Bivalves). Tanganyika Notes and Records. 63

Veneridae